Sing My Heart Out is the second studio album by English singer Sam Bailey. It was released on 16 September 2016 by Tiger Drum. The album's lead single, "Sing My Heart Out", was released on 9 September 2016.

Track listing

Charts

References

2016 albums
Sam Bailey albums